is a stable of sumo wrestlers, part of the Nishonoseki  ichimon or group of stables. As of January 2023, it had 10 wrestlers.

History

It was founded as Chiganoura stable in September 2004 by former sekiwake Masudayama, who branched off from Kasugano stable of the Dewanoumi ichimon at the unusually late age of 53, after he lost out to Tochinowaka in his bid to take over Kasugano stable. He took four wrestlers with him from Kasugano stable, the last of whom, Burinosato, retired in March 2019. In April 2016 the former Takamisugi took over the running of the stable when Masudayama reached the mandatory retirement age of 65, and aligned the stable with the Takanohana ichimon, leaving the Dewanoumi ichimon. The former Chiganoura changed to Tokiwayama and was re-employed by the stable as a consultant for five years.  In June 2018 the Takanohana ichimon dissolved and Chiganoura joined the Ōnomatsu group, with Masudayama choosing to be unaffiliated. In September, the stable joined the Nishonoseki group and on 1 October Chiganoura adopted the wrestlers and staff from the defunct Takanohana stable following the resignation of Takanohana from the Japan Sumo Association. In November Takakeishō won the top division championship in his first tournament for his new stable, and in March 2019 he was promoted to ōzeki. In November 2020, as Masudayama's retirement approached, as part of a previous agreement, former Takamisugi and former Masudayama swapped back their elder names, and former Takamisugi changed the name of the stable to his original elder name, Tokiwayama.

Until 2021 it was located in Taitō nearby the Sensō-ji temple, and operated out of the same building as the old Takasago stable, before it merged with the Wakamatsu stable. In February 2021 the stable moved to new premises in Maeno-chō, Itabashi ward. The old premises are set to be used by Tatsunami stable, with Chiganoura-oyakata continued to live until his consultancy period ended in November 2021 and he left the Sumo Association.

It was home to the only Hungarian in professional sumo, Masutōō, who was on the podium at the 2004 Junior Sumo World Championships alongside Tochinoshin, Gōeidō and Kaisei but did not progress beyond the makushita division in professional sumo.

Ring name conventions
Many wrestlers at this stable take ring names or shikona that begin with the character 舛 (read: masu), in deference to their former coach and the stable's founder, the former Masudayama. Examples include Masunoshō, Masutoo and Masutenryū. However, when Masunoshō was promoted to the jūryō division after the September 2017 tournament his shikona was changed to Takanoshō, after the new head coach Takamisugi.

Owner
2016–present: 15th and 17th Tokiwayama Takakatsu (iin, former komusubi Takamisugi)
2004-2016: 19th Chiganoura Yasuhito (riji, former sekiwake Masudayama)

Notable active wrestlers

 Takakeishō (best rank ōzeki)
 Takanoshō (best rank sekiwake)
Takakentō (best rank juryō)

Former wrestlers
Takanoiwa (best rank maegashira)
Takanofuji (best rank jūryō)
Takagenji (best rank maegashira)
Masunoyama (best rank maegashira)

Coach
Tokiwayama Yasuhito (consultant, former sekiwake Masudayama)

Assistant
 (sewanin, former makushita, real name Hiroshi Yamada)
 (sewanin, former makushita who was the last surviving member of the March 1988 entry class when he retired in 2013, real name Takao Inoue)

Referees
Kimura Hideaki (makushita gyōji, real name Akira Moriyasu)
Kimura Masatoshi (jonidan gyoji, real name Shohei Uto)

Usher
Hiroshi (jonokuchi yobidashi, real name Hiraoka Yoshitake)

Hairdresser
Tokokatsu (1st class tokoyama)
Tokosen (third class tokoyama)

Location and access
Tokyo, Itabashi ward, Maeno-chō
15 minute walk from Tokiwadai Station, Tōbu Tōjō Line

See also
List of sumo stables
List of active sumo wrestlers
List of past sumo wrestlers
Glossary of sumo terms

References

External links
Official site 
Japan Sumo Association profile

Active sumo stables